The Vulcan Motor and Engineering Company Limited, of Southport, England, made cars from 1902 until 1928 and commercial vehicles from 1914 until 1953.

History

1902-1918
Brothers Thomas and Joseph Hampson had built an experimental car in Bolton in 1899. In 1902 they moved to Southport trading as Vulcan Motor Manufacturing and Trading and built the first Vulcan car which was a 4hp single-cylinder belt-driven type driving the rear wheels through a two speed gearbox and a belt to the back axle. In 1903, this grew to 6.5hp with shaft drive and the chassis was now "armoured ash". Twin-cylinder 1.5 L models followed in 1904 now with steel chassis and in 1905, 2 and then 3 L four-cylinder types appeared and the company moved from Yellow House Lane to Hawesside Street, both in Southport. Things kept growing and a van version of the twin came in 1906 along with large 4.8 L six-cylinder models and a move to even larger premises at Crossens, Southport with a change of company name to Vulcan Motor and Engineering. The six-cylinder model grew to 6 L in 1908. In 1912, a new small car — the 10/12 of 1.8 L with two-cylinder Aster engine — was added, the first use of a bought in engine.

At the outbreak of World War I, the range consisted of the 2.4 L four-cylinder 10/15, the 2.6 L 15.9, the 3 L 15/20 and the last of the old sixes, the 25/30. As a sign of things to come, a  truck was also offered. This model saw use as an ambulance in Britain, India, Belgium, Russia, and Portugal. During the war, the factory concentrated on munitions. In 1916, the Hampson brothers left the company and it was reformed as Vulcan Motor Engineering (1916) under the control of C.B. Wardman. In 1918, the company bought Southport F.C. which was renamed Southport Vulcan — thus becoming the first football club to take a sponsor's name.

1919-1930
In 1919, Harper Bean acquired 75% of the company under a complex cash and shares deal and went into the British Motor Trading Corporation with the intention Vulcan be responsible for commercial vehicles; nevertheless, car production continued. The group also included Swift Motor Company and a number of components manufacturers.

With peace the first new launch was the 16 with 2.6 L Dorman engine. The cars now had a flat radiator replacing the pre-war "bullnose" type. There was also a nominal 12 model which became the main product from 1920 to 1927, which was available with a range of engines from Dorman (1.8 L), Meadows (1.5 L), and British Anzani (1.5 L). The model was also sold as the Lea-Francis Kirkstone as from 1922 the companies shared some manufacturing and a dealer network. The 20 available from 1920 to 1922 with 3.3 L Vulcan engine and from 1923 to 1925 with 3.7 L shared mechanical components with the 1½ and 2 ton trucks. The final car was the 14/40 (1927–28) and 16/60 (1928–29) with their own design twin camshaft six of 1.7 and 2 L. Production capacity was nearly 5000 per annum, a potential never reached as the orders did not materialize. Nonetheless, over 6000 Vulcans of all kinds were sold from the armistice until 1923, which proved to be a high watermark for the company. The 1½ and 2 ton models were the mainstay of truck production until the 1926 introduction of heavier four ton units, with four-cylinder engines and also a six-cylinder Dorman bus chassis. Commercial vehicles began to supplant automobiles as Vulcan's main product around this time, with buses and light (¾ ton) military vehicles alongside the trucks.

Financial problems came in 1928 and C. B. Wardman resigned and officially no more Vulcan cars came from Southport but some badged as Lea-Francis were made up to 1930.

1930-1953

From 1930, production was solely of trucks and buses which had been made seriously since 1922. Many of the trucks were aimed at the municipal market and road sweepers and refuse trucks sold well. New lighter commercials of American inspired designs depredated Vulcan's sales, however, and the Great Depression made things more dire yet. By 1931 the company was in compulsory liquidation, although they continued trading in their more profitable fields for several years, building small volumes.

Amongst the buses, twenty-seater buses were sold from 1922 on the two-ton chassis. A 6.6 L Vulcan-engined 32-seat Brisbane came in 1928 and the Emperor double decker in 1930.

Brockhouse Engineering took over Vulcan in the mid-thirties and managed to keep production going until 1938, when the remains of the company was sold to Tilling-Stevens, a bus manufacturer of Maidstone, Kent. Vulcan (petrol) or Gardner (diesel) engined trucks re-entered production, alongside a new five ton, Perkins-engined lorry. Six ton Vulcans were produced in large numbers during World War II, also with electric power. After the war, six tonners and heavier articulated trucks were built in large numbers, around 1000 per year, and a new seven tonner appeared at that 1950's Commercial Motor Show in London. A few buses & coaches were built on Vulcan chassis  one CCF777 a 6PF chassis was built with a Dutfield C29F body for Goldsmith Coaches of Sicklesmere in 1950. The range was successful enough that Tilling-Stevens ended up being taken over by the Rootes Group in 1951. Rootes, however, had their own established commercial makers in Commer and Karrier and as those brands introduced their own heavier trucks both Vulcan and Tilling-Stevens were squeezed out. The two brands vanished finally in 1953.

Factory buildings
The original factory premises at 13 Yellowhouse Lane were finally demolished on 25 March 2010 as a result of the British government policy to levy business taxes on the owners of empty buildings.

The second factory which was built in 1907 in Rufford Road, Crossens, Southport has also been demolished in early 2020 to make way for housing.

See also
 Hick, Hargreaves & Co. Ltd.
 List of car manufacturers of the United Kingdom

References

External links

Defunct bus manufacturers of the United Kingdom
Defunct truck manufacturers of the United Kingdom
Defunct motor vehicle manufacturers of England
Southport
Companies based in Merseyside